Azzopardi is an Italian surname of Lombard origin. It is a rare surname.

Distribution 
The name is now naturalized in Italy, Malta, Greece and France in the form Azzopardi written in various documents as Azupardu, Azuparda (in the 1419 militia list), Aczupard, Zupard (1480 militia list), Azzupard, Azzoppardo, Azzopardo, Azzopardi, Azzoppardi, Zoppardo, Zopardo, in the Status Animarum or church census of 1687. It still occurs in Northern Italy in the form Azzopardo (mainly in Julian Venetia), in Sicily in the forms Zuppardo, Zuppardi and in Corfu, Greece "Ατσοπάρδης".

Etymology 
It derives from a combination of the Langobardic Italian names Azzo meaning 'noble' and Pardo, originally the name of a Germanic tribe (the Bardi); Surnames including "Azzo" are likely related to the Germanic hadu (war, battle), per Weber, or to atha, atta (father).

An alternative etymology is from the Greek σόω (race) and πάρδος (panther), as "fighter of the Saracens" (often referred to as the panther race). This Greek etymology (analogous to other Eastern Sicilian surnames like Cacopardo) is today disreputed.

Azzopardi is sometimes listed among the names of the Jewish Italkim community, however there are few sources to support this, with a supposed etymology from sefardi. As the name is attested in Malta in 1419–1420, before the expulsion of the Jews from Spain and Portugal (and from Malta), it is unlikely that its etymology may be related to sefardi.
According to Godfrey Wettinger, "Some would regard Azzopardi as ethnic, associating it with the word Sephardic referring to an Oriental Jew, but the separate existence of Accio and Pardo as surnames in the twelfth century counsels caution in reaching premature conclusions."

History 
A Genoese notary of the 13th century bore the name Ogerius Açopardus. This being one of the oldest Italian surnames, introduced by one or more Christian settlers from Sicily some time between the thirteenth and the fifteenth century.
Malta's Militia list of 1419-1420 includes the names of Thumeu and Antoni Azupardu.

A certain Francisco Azopardo was commissioned by the Holy Inquisition in Malta as an Arabic-language reader, as we can read in this document dated 22 September 1637: "... Ref.ente Em.o D Card. Albornotio l.tas R.mi Inquisitoris Melitensis de schola Arabica in ea Insula erigenda, and of D. Francisco Azopardo anthe Collegij de Prop. Fide Alumno Reader linguae Arabicae in ea deputando; Sac. Con. probans, censuit scholam p.tam them in from Insula erigendum, et Lectorem deputandum, ac constituendum esse praefatu D. Franciscum; ..".

People 

 Antonio Azzopardi (1805–1881), Maltese settler in Australia
 Ayrton Azzopardi (born 1993), Maltese footballer
 Barry Azzopardi (born 1947), Gibraltarian chemical engineer
 Charles Azzopardi (1930–1970), Maltese footballer
 Clare Azzopardi (born 1977), Maltese author
 Edward Azzopardi (born 1977), Maltese footballer
 Francesco Azopardi (1748–1809), Maltese composer
 Franck Azzopardi (born 1970), French footballer
 Frederick Azzopardi (born 1949), Maltese politician
 Gilles Azzopardi (1967–2020), French actor and theatre director
 Gilles d'Ambra Azzopardi (born 1949), French psychosociologist
 Ġużè Muscat Azzopardi (1853–1927), Maltese novelist
 Ian Azzopardi (born 1982), Maltese footballer
 Jack Frendo Azzopardi (born 1915), Maltese water polo player
 Jason Azzopardi (born 1971), Maltese politician
 Jayne Azzopardi, Australian television personality
 John G. Azzopardi (1929–2013), Maltese pathologist
 Joseph Azzopardi, Chief Justice of Malta (2018–2020)
 Juan Bautista Azopardo (1772–1848), Maltese privateer and Argentine Navy officer
 Justus Azzopardi (18th century), Maltese philosopher
 Keith Azopardi (born 1967), Gibraltarian lawyer and politician
 Maria Azzopardi (born 1983), Maltese footballer
 Mario Philip Azzopardi (born 1950), Maltese television and film director
 Mya Azzopardi (born 2002), Maltese swimmer
 Michael Azzopardi (born 1987), Maltese designer and entrepreneur
 Nicole Azzopardi, Maltese singer-songwriter 
 Peppi Azzopardi (born 1959), Maltese television presenter
 Robert Camilleri Azzopardi (born 1951), Maltese Roman Catholic priest
 Salvino Azzopardi (1931–2006), Maltese-Indian philosopher
 Samantha Azzopardi (born 1988), Australian con artist
 Shyanne Azzopardi, Miss Gibraltar 2014
 Trezza Azzopardi (born 1961), Welsh writer
 Vincenzo Frendo Azzopardi, Chief Justice of Malta (1915–1919)

See also 
 Azopardi, a similar surname

References 

Godfrey Wettinger, "The Origin of 'Maltese' Surnames", Melita Historica, xii, 4 (1999), 333-344: Ref. [27] For Accio see: Codice diplomatico della Repubblica di Genova, "Fonti per la Storia d'Italia", Roma 1942, III, doc. 44, p. 120: Azo Rovedus, Azo Borel, giugno 1197; and Azo de Pangiano, Azo, Salvaticus, Azo Rovedus, and Azo de Avolasca in ibid., doc. 50, pp. 131–132, 27 Agosto 1198. Ogerius Açopardus figures among witnesses to a notarial deed in Genoa on 4 August 1201: Giovanni de Guiberto (1200–1211), a cura di M.W. Hall-Cole et al., "Notai liguri del secolo XII, vol. V," Genoa, 1940, doc. 350 in vol. I, 173.

Roman Catholic families
Maltese-language surnames